Nurdağı District is a district of Gaziantep Province of Turkey. Its administrative center is the town Nurdağı.

References

Districts of Gaziantep Province